The Uranium Mill Tailings Remedial Action (UMTRA) Project was created by the United States Department of Energy (DOE) to monitor the cleanup of uranium mill tailings.

In 1978 the US Congress passed the Uranium Mill Tailings Radiation Control Act (UMTRCA) which was tasked the DOE with the responsibility of stabilizing, disposing, and controlling uranium mill tailings and other contaminated material at uranium mill processing spread across 10 states and at approximately 5,200 associated properties. Under UMTRCA, the DOE created UMTRA to decommission 24 uranium mills and dispose of their residual mill tailings. These are typically stored in an engineered disposal cell, described in the 1995 . designed to reduce groundwater contamination, as well as withstanding precipitation and flood events, withstanding "maximum credible earthquakes", and preferably having a design lifespan of 1000 years. The covers are also designed to substantially reduce radon gas emission. The disposal cells are located at the mill site or within 5 miles, if possible.

References

United States Department of Energy